Cape Fullerton (Qatiktalik in Inuktitut) is a cape and peninsula in the Kivalliq Region of Nunavut, Canada located on the northwest shores of Hudson Bay on Roes Welcome Sound and includes Fullerton Harbour. Today it is part of Ukkusiksalik National Park.

In the early 1900s, Fullerton Harbour was a popular wintering station for American and Scottish whaling ships and a trading point between Inuit and southern whalers. In September 1903, the first North-West Mounted Police outpost was established at Cape Fullerton both to establish Canadian sovereignty as well as to administer whaling licenses, collect customs, control liquor, and maintain order. The NWMP closed about 1914.

From 1915 until 1919, Captain George Cleveland (1871–1925) ran a trading post at Fullerton Harbour, under the employ of furrier F. N. Monjo of New York City. In 1919, the Hudson's Bay Company obtained the post and Cleveland moved it to Repulse Bay (now Naujaat). It was also in 1919 that Captain George Comer grounded his schooner, the Finback, at Cape Fullerton; it was to be his last Arctic voyage.

In 1924, an old carpenter's shop and an outbuilding were dismantled from the remains of Cape Fullerton Outpost and the lumber shipped to Chesterfield Inlet.

In the winter of 1940–41, "the disused Police barracks at Fullerton Harbour" were still being used for refuge for travellers.

Notes

Peninsulas of Kivalliq Region
Fullerton